Catterick may refer to:

Places
Catterick, North Yorkshire, England, a village
Catterick Garrison, British Army garrison near Catterick village in North Yorkshire
RAF Catterick, former Royal Air Force base in North Yorkshire

People
Harry Catterick (1919–1985), English football player and manager
John Catterick (died 1419), English bishop

Other
Catterick, comedy show